The 2015–16 Primera B de Chile was the 63rd season of Chile's second-flight football. The competition began on July 25, 2015 and ends in May, 2016.

Participating teams

Stadia and locations

First stage

League table (Apertura)

Play-offs (Apertura)

Semi-finals

First leg

Second leg

Final

First leg

Second leg

Second stage

League table (Clausura)

Play-offs (Clausura)

Aggregate table

See also
 2015–16 Chilean Primera División season
 2015–16 Segunda División Profesional de Chile

References
Second Division - RSSSF

Primera B de Chile seasons
Primera B
Chil
Chil